Acraga sexquicentenaria is a moth in the family Dalceridae. It was described by Orfila in 1961. It is found in southern Brazil, northern Uruguay and northern Argentina.

References

Moths described in 1961
Dalceridae